Port Hope may refer to:

Port Hope, Michigan, U.S.
Port Hope, Ontario, Canada
Port Hope (Peter's Field) Aerodrome
Port Hope Conference
Port Hope Panthers
Port Hope railway station
Port Hope Transit
Trenton Golden Hawks, formerly the Port Hope Predators
Port Hope Simpson, Newfoundland and Labrador, Canada
Port Hope Simpson Airport
Port Hope Township, Beltrami County, Minnesota, U.S.